Frontier Marshal may refer to:

 Frontier Marshal (1934 film), an American western starring George O'Brien
 Frontier Marshal (1939 film), an American western starring Randolph Scott
 Wyatt Earp: Frontier Marshal, a 1931 novel by Stuart N. Lake; basis for both films